Ilie Verdeț (10 May 1925 – 20 March 2001) was a Romanian communist politician who served as Romania’s Prime Minister from 1979 to 1982.

Biography
Born in Comănești, Bacău County, and a miner from age 12, he joined the Romanian Communist Party (PCR) in 1945. After graduating from the Bucharest Academy of Economic Studies, he climbed through the party apparatus. By the early 1960s, he was working in the central office of the PCR in Bucharest, as deputy of Nicolae Ceauşescu, who was in charge of party organization and appointments. After the death of Gheorghe Gheorghiu-Dej in March 1965, Verdeț helped Ceaușescu gain the position of Secretary General of the PCR.

Soon afterwards, Verdeț was promoted to the Permanent Bureau of the Political Executive Committee of the PCR. He held many political positions, including those of Deputy Prime Minister (1966–1974) and Prime Minister of Romania (1979–1982). He was sent by Ceaușescu to solve the Jiu Valley miners' strike of 1977, but was unable to negotiate and was held hostage for two days (which he had later denied).

After the fall of Ceaușescu in December 1989, Verdeţ declared himself the head of a provisional government, but it only lasted for about 20 minutes, after which he was pushed aside by Ion Iliescu, who emerged as the leader of the National Salvation Front (FSN). 

Subsequently, in 1990, Verdeț founded a political party called Socialist Party of Labour, which narrowly entered Parliament in the 1992 elections, but in the next elections failed to win any seats. He remained the leader of PSM until the 2000 elections, after which he was removed from this position.

He died of a heart attack in 2001 in Bucharest at the age of 75.

Private life
Verdeț and his wife Reghina married in 1947. They had two daughters: Doina (b. 1948) and Cezarina (b. 1953).

References

External links
 Gabriel Partos, "Obituary: Ilie Verdet", The Independent,  April 23, 2001

Prime Ministers of Romania
Deputy Prime Ministers of Romania
State Council of Romania
Romanian communists
People of the Romanian Revolution
Bucharest Academy of Economic Studies alumni
People from Comănești
1925 births
2001 deaths
Burials at Ghencea Cemetery
Romanian coal miners